Xenocerus speciosus is a species of beetles from the family Anthribidae, also known as fungus weevils.

Description 
Xenocerus speciosus can reach a body length of about 10 mm. The basic colour is greyish, with black markings on the pronotum and the elytra.

Distribution 
This species can be found in Nias Island.

References 

 Biolib
 Global species

Anthribidae
Beetles described in 1898